Navalis is a genus of  minute freshwater snails with an operculum, aquatic gastropod molluscs or micromolluscs in the Hydrobiidae family.

Species
 Navalis edetanus Talaván-Serna, Quiñonero-Salgado, Á. Alonso & Rolán, 2021
 Navalis perforatus Quiñonero-Salgado & Rolán, 2017

References

External links
 Quiñonero-Salgado S. & Rolán E. (2017). Navalis perforatus a new genus and new species (Gastropoda, Hydrobiidae) from Spain. Nemus. 7: 7-11

Hydrobiidae